Maya Andreyevna Petrova (née Kaverina;  born 26 May 1982) is a former Russian handball player for Rostov-Don and the Russian national team.

At the 2009 World Women's Handball Championship she reached the final and won the gold medal with the Russian team.

In May 2020 Petrova announced her retirement.

References

External links

1982 births
Living people
Russian female handball players
Sportspeople from Volgograd
Olympic handball players of Russia
Olympic medalists in handball
Olympic gold medalists for Russia
Medalists at the 2016 Summer Olympics
Handball players at the 2016 Summer Olympics